Mount Prophet is a steep and remote mountain in the North Cascades of Washington state. Located between several isolated valleys west of Ross Lake and east of the Picket Range, the mountain was named in reference to Tommy Rowland, a "religiously fanatic" prospector who lived by the Skagit River in the late 19th century. Because of its difficult-to-access location, few people have attempted to climb Mount Prophet.

It is the 18th most prominent peak in Washington state.

Nearby mountains
 Mount Terror
 Mount Fury
 Mount Blum
 Genesis Peak

References

External links
 

Mountains of Whatcom County, Washington
Mountains of Washington (state)
North Cascades of Washington (state)
North Cascades National Park